John Whitelocke (1757 – 23 October 1833) was a British Army officer.

Military career
Educated at Marlborough Grammar School and at Lewis Lochée's military academy in Chelsea, Whitelocke entered the army in 1778 and served in Jamaica and in San Domingo. He was appointed Lieutenant-Governor of Portsmouth and General Officer Commanding South-West District on 25 June 1799, commanding the garrison during the height of invasion scares in Britain. On 10 November 1804 he was made a lieutenant-general and inspector-general of recruiting, during a period of significant expansion of the British Army. In 1807 he was appointed to command an expedition to seize Buenos Aires from the Spanish Empire, which was in disarray due to events in Europe. The attack failed and the British surrendered after suffering heavy losses. Whitelocke undertook negotiations with the opposing general, Santiago de Liniers, and having decided that the British position was untenable, signed the surrender and ordered the British forces to abandon Montevideo and return home later that year.

This proceeding was regarded with great disfavour by many under his command and the British Army and public, and its author was brought before a court-martial convened at The Royal Hospital in London in 1808. On all the charges, except one, he was found guilty and he was dismissed from the service. He lived in retirement until his death at Hall Barn Park, Beaconsfield, Buckinghamshire on 23 October 1833.

Notes

References
 Ben Hughes, The British Invasion of the River Plate 1806-1807: How the Redcoats Were Humbled and a Nation Was Born (2014).

1757 births
1833 deaths
British Army generals
British Army personnel of the French Revolutionary Wars
British Army personnel of the Napoleonic Wars
British Army personnel who were court-martialled
West Yorkshire Regiment officers
King's Royal Rifle Corps officers
Somerset Light Infantry officers
West India Regiment officers
British invasions of the River Plate